Prometheus is the name of two fictional characters appearing in American comic books published by Marvel Comics. The first one is based on the Greek Titan of the same name while the second one is member of the Pantheon.

Publication history
The mythological Prometheus first appeared in The Avengers #282 and was adapted by Roger Stern and John Buscema.

The Pantheon version of Prometheus first appeared in The Incredible Hulk vol. 2 #368 and was created by Peter David.

Fictional character biography

Prometheus (Olympian)

Prometheus is one of the Titans of Greek Mythology and the son of Iapetus. His siblings included Atlas, Menoetius, and Epimetheus. When their uncle Cronus' rule is challenged by Zeus, Prometheus and Epimetheus side with the Olympians while Atlas and Menoetius side with Cronus. With the help of Prometheus and Epimetheus, the Olympians defeat the Titans. Prometheus and Epimetheus take an interest in mankind and become the joint rulers in Phthia. Prometheus later learns various skills from Athena that concern Zeus. When Prometheus takes fire from the Gods and teaches the humans how to cook, Zeus has Kratos and Bia bind Prometheus to a pillar in the Caucasian Mountains using chains that were forged by Hephaestus. Zeus also has an eagle peck out Prometheus' liver which grows back every night. Zeus offers to shorten his life of being chained to a pillar if Prometheus gives him the vision of the prophecy that will one day dethrone Zeus. Seven generations later, Hercules comes across Prometheus during his 12 Labours when on his way to the Amazons. Hercules kills the eagle and then frees Prometheus. Zeus is at first against this, but decides to end Prometheus' punishment. Prometheus foresaw this event and vows to repay Hercules one day.

In the modern era, Hercules is injured in a fight with Baron Helmut Zemo's Masters of Evil where Black Mamba drugs Hercules causing him to charge into battle. When Zeus (who was unaware that the Masters of Evil were responsible for Hercules ending up in a coma) has Neptune abduct Namor and bring him to the Underworld, Prometheus manages to heal Namor after he escaped Cerberus and made it across the Phlegethon River. He then directs Namor to where the other Avengers are being held, which happens to be the Garrison of the Accursed at Fortress Tartarus. Afterwards, the Avengers make their way to Mount Olympus, where Prometheus speaks to them while they are in the woods. Zeus catches up to the Avengers while Doctor Druid heals Hercules' brain, Prometheus then declares that the battle between man and gods has begun. While Zeus continues his fight with the Avengers, Hera sides with Prometheus and Hermes. Prometheus heals Captain America and Doctor Druid before proceeding to try his luck into healing Hercules, where Doctor Druid and Apollo have failed. Under the advice of Hermes, Prometheus calls upon Gaea's help to do so while Thor and Captain Marvel continue their fight with Zeus. When Captain Marvel attempts to attack Zeus, the blinding light he gives off distracts Prometheus, which causes Hercules to be revived in a state of paranoia, in which he attacks Prometheus. However, Doctor Druid manages to fully heal Hercules' mind. After Zeus' attack was halted, Prometheus arrives, showing signs of aging with some of his hair turning white. Prometheus then attends a reception on Mount Olympus. Before teleporting the Avengers away, Prometheus warns the Avengers that there will be many challenges to come to them and that mankind will be sorely tested by one of them.

Prometheus (Pantheon)

Prometheus is a member of the fictional super hero family, Pantheon. The Pantheon is led by Agamemnon, the father of all its super-powered members. Prometheus is born with a deformed face that looks burned. He drives a very high tech vehicle created by the Pantheon engineers, called the Argo, and debuted trying to kidnap Bruce Banner (the Hulk's alter-ego).

He later assists the Hulk by transporting his wife, Betty Banner. He expects her to react badly to his burnt face, but instead she insults his smoking habit.

Prometheus is characterised as an excellent tracker, even over interstellar distances. He uses this as part of a mission to help his fellow Pantheon member, Atalanta. While rescuing her, they learn that Agamemnon had gained his resources by selling out his future descendants.

Because of this, Agamemnon is captured and put on trial. Having been revealed to be mad, he unleashes his 'Endless Knights', cyborgs made of his dead children. During the battle, the Hulk entrusts Prometheus with the safety of Betty.

Powers and abilities
The Olympian version of Prometheus has super-strength, a healing factor, and precognition.

The Pantheon Prometheus has expert tracking skills. Like the other Pantheon members, Prometheus possesses a healing factor.

References

External links
 
 Prometheus (Pantheon) at Marvel Wiki

Characters created by Peter David
Comics articles that need to differentiate between fact and fiction
Comics characters introduced in 1993
Fictional characters with precognition
Marvel Comics characters
Marvel Comics characters with accelerated healing
Marvel Comics characters with superhuman strength
Prometheus
Classical mythology in Marvel Comics
Characters created by Roger Stern
Characters created by John Buscema